W. F. Stone & Son or Stone Boat Yard was a small wooden shipbuilding company in Alameda, California. To support the World War 2 demand for ships W. F. Stone & Son  built tugboats, sub chasers and minesweepers. For World War 1 the shipyard, then called W. F. Stone & Son at Kennedy and Bocimer Streets, built tugboats for postwar work in 1921. The shipyard was opened in 1853 by William F. Stone (W. F. Stone), from Dartmouth, England, at the Hunter's Point in San Francisco Bay, near the current Hunters Point Naval Shipyard. In 1892 William Stone's son, Frank, ran the company and moved the shipyard to Tiburon. In 1899 he moved the shipyard again to Harbor View, San Francisco. In 1911, he again moved to Diesel Way, in Oakland, near Union Point Park on the Tidal Canal. When Lester Stone, Frank's son, became a partner, the company was changed to W. F. Stone & Son. In 1923, Frank Stone died, Lester Stone continued the company. In 1942 the company moved again, to 2517 Blanding Ave, Alameda on the south side of the Tidal Canal. In 1970 Lester Stone retired and sold the shipyard to John Whitset. Whitset, who did not rename the company, the company went into bankruptcy in 1986. It came out of bankruptcy and was sold to Bill and Grace Bodle. Bodle sold the company in 2000 to David Olson. The shipyard closed in 2004. For most of its history, the shipyard built a large variety of schooners, fishing boats, cargo ships, tugboats, sailboats, racing and recreational yachts.

Notable ships
Notable ships include:
 was a 1914 209-ton, schooner-rigged, diesel-powered yacht used by the US Navy for World War I and World War II, she was then transferred to the Royal Australian Navy. She sank in Subic Bay in 1947 during a typhoon.
Sold to Costa Rica in 1943.
 Northern Light a 247-ton, 140-foot yacht built for John Borden, a Chicago banker. On April 21, 1927, Borden, his wife and crew took the Northern Light on an expedition to the Arctic on behalf of the Field Museum of Chicago. Borden's wife wrote a book about the Arctic expedition, The Cruise of the Northern Light. released in December 1928.

World War 2
World War 2 ships built for the US Navy:

 YMS-299, YMS-300 and YMS-301 were s built for the US Navy to remove naval mines that had been placed in the water to prevent ships from passing. They were armed with one 40 mm gun mount, two 20 mm guns, machine guns, and two depth charge racks.
They were armed with one 3"/50 caliber gun, one 20 mm anti-air (AA) gun, four depth charge projectors, one depth charge Hedgehog projector, and two depth charge tracks. Power was from two  General Motors 8-268A diesel engines to a Snow and Knobstedt single reduction gear to two shafts.
 YT 254 and YT 255 were District Harbor Tug, Large. They were armed with two .50 cal. machine guns. Power was one diesel engine and a single propeller creating .

See also
 California during World War II
 Maritime history of California
Wooden boats of World War 2

References

American Theater of World War II
1940s in California
American boat builders
Defunct shipbuilding companies of the United States